Eileen Vidal BEM (died October, 2003) was a kelper telephone and radio operator who maintained radio service and relayed military intelligence to the British Navy during the Falklands War, receiving the British Empire Medal for her service.

Service during the Falklands War

Eileen Vidal was a middle-aged woman, single parent and the islands government's principal radio telephone operator, jotting down telegrams and patching callers into Port Stanley's telephone system. She established a trend of subversive radio transmissions on the morning of the Argentine invasion on 2 April. Her message to HMS Endurance may have been the first information to come from the Falklands after the invasion because the short wave transmitters operated by Cable and Wireless had failed and the British Government had no firm information from the islands. The 2nd Battalion of the Parachute Regiment (2 PARA) was alerted and set sail to the Falklands. She was awarded the British Empire Medal for her service during the war.

References

Recipients of the British Empire Medal
People of the Falklands War
Falkland Islands women
2003 deaths